The red deer of Exmoor have been hunted since Norman times, when Exmoor was declared a Royal Forest. Collyns stated the earliest record of a pack of Staghounds on Exmoor was 1598. In 1803, the "North Devon Staghounds" became a subscription pack. In 1824/5 30 couples of hounds, the last of the true staghounds, were sold to a baron in Germany. Today, the Devon and Somerset is one of three staghounds packs in the UK, the others being the Quantock Staghounds and the Tiverton Staghounds. All packs hunt within Devon and Somerset. The Chairman as of 2016 is Tom Yandle, who was previously High Sheriff of Somerset in 1999.

Season
The approximate dates of the hunting season are:
Hind hunting: 1 November-28 February
Stag hunting:
Autumn: August to third week in October; formerly 12 August to 8 October, according to Collyns
Spring: last week of March; continues about three weeks

List of masters

 "Hugh Pollard", master in 1598. (Sir Hugh II Pollard of King's Nympton, father of Sir Lewis Pollard, 1st Baronet (c. 1578–c.  1645))

 Edward Dyke (d. 1746), of Pixton, in Somerset, (eldest brother of Thomas Dyke (d. 1745) of Tetton and of John Dyke (d. 1732) of Holnicote, all in Somerset), was the warden and lesee of the royal forest of Exmoor and  Master of Staghounds, which office usually was held by the warder. He married Margaret Trevelyan, a daughter of Sir John Trevelyan, 2nd Baronet (1670–1755), of Nettlecombe in Somerset, and widow of Alexander Luttrell (1705–1737) of Dunster Castle. Edward inherited Holnicote and estates in Bampton from his brother John Dyke (d. 1732), who died without progeny. He too died without progeny and bequeathed Pixton and Holnicote to his niece Elizabeth Dyke (d. 1753), whom he appointed his sole executor, daughter and sole heiress of his brother Thomas Dyke (d. 1745) of Tetton, Kingston St Mary, Somerset. The bequest stipulated that Elizabeth and her husband Sir Thomas Acland, 7th Baronet (1722–1785) of Killerton in Devon and Petherton Park in Somerset, should adopt the additional surname of Dyke.

 1746-1775 Sir Thomas Dyke Acland, 7th Baronet (1722–1785), of Killerton in Devon and of Petherton Park, Tetton, Holnicote and Pixton, all in Somerset, kept his own pack of staghounds. He became forester or ranger of Exmoor under grant from the Crown and "hunted the country in almost princely style. Respected and beloved by all the countryside, he was solicited at the same time to allow himself to be returned as member of Parliament for the counties of Devon and Somerset. He preferred, however, the duties and pleasures of life in the country, where he bore without abuse the grand old name of gentleman". Although he had three of his own kennels on his huge estates, at Holnicote in the north and at Jury and Highercombe near Pixton in the south, he had a further method of keeping hounds, which was to make the keeping of one hound a term in many of the tenancy contracts he granted. In his manor of Bossington (near Holnicote) alone an estate survey of 1746–7 lists twelve tenements let, either by Acland or Dyke, with the requirement to keep a hound. In 1775 he handed over the mastership to the then Major Basset, and in 1779 his beloved collection of stag heads and antlers at Holnicote was lost in a fire which also destroyed the house. He declared that "he minded the destruction of his valuables less bitterly than the loss of his fine collection of stags' heads". He was known on his estates as "Sir Thomas his Honour" (as later was his son the 9th Baronet) and was renowned for his generous hospitality at Holnicote or at Pixton, whichever was closest, to all riders "in at the death", and it is said that "open house was kept at Pixton and Holnicote throughout the hunting season". Pixton was the larger establishment, richly equipped with silver-plate and linen, including 73 tablecloths, but both houses had silver dinner services of five dozen plates and any number of tankards, cups, bowls, dishes and salvers. A letter dated 1759 written on behalf of Courtenay Walrond of Bradfield, Uffculme describes the Acland hospitality:
"This noble chase being ended, my master, his brother and Mr Brutton with about 20 gentlemen more waited on Sir Thomas Acland at Pixton where each of them drank the health of the stag in a full quart glass of claret placed in the stag's mouth & after drinking several proper healths they went in good order to their respective beds about 2 o'clock and dined with Sir Thomas the next day on a haunch of the noble creature and about 50 dishes of the greatest rarities among which were several black grouse".
He returned briefly as joint-master in August 1784, but died in February 1785, aged 63

North Devon Staghounds
 1775-1784 Col. Francis Basset Esq. (c.1740-1802), of Heanton Court, Heanton Punchardon, near Barnstaple, and of Umberleigh House, Umberleigh, Lt. Col. of the North Devon Militia 1779-93), MP for Barnstaple 1780-84. He is not however stated in his History of Parliament biography  to have been a colonel, or a military man in any capacity, yet was termed "Col. Bassett" by the Devon topographer Rev. John Swete in his 1796 painting of Heanton Court, Heanton Punchardon, near Barnstaple, which he described as the seat of "Col. Basset". He was the second but only surviving son of John Francis Basset (1714–1757) by his wife Eleanor Courtenay, daughter of Sir William Courtenay, 2nd Baronet and de jure 6th Earl of Devon. He died unmarried, being the last in the male line of the Heanton branch of the ancient Basset family. His heir was his nephew Joseph Davie (1764-1846) of Orleigh Court, near Bideford, who took the name Basset in lieu of his patronymic and built Watermouth Castle, near Lynmouth.He was the son of John Davie of Orleigh by his wife Eleanora Bassett, sister of Col. Bassett (d.1802). Joseph's granddaughter and eventual heiress was Harriet Mary Bassett (d.1920), who married Charles Henry Williams, who assumed the surname Bassett as a condition of inheriting his wife's property, and became master 1887-93 (see below). The Basset family is an ancient West Country family, which originated either in the manor of Tehidy, Cornwall or at Whitechapel Manor in the parish of Bishops Nympton, Devon.

 1784-1794 Sir Thomas Dyke Acland, 9th Baronet (1752-1794), second son of the 7th Baronet who was master 1746-1775. He devoted the last ten years of his life almost entirely to staghunting and virtually abandoned the family's main seat at Killerton, preferring to live almost entirely at Holnicote and at Highercombe, near Dulverton, in the heart of the hunting country. He killed 101 stags during his mastership, the antlers of thirty of which are still affixed to the walls of the stables at Holnicote. Like his father legendary for his expansive hospitality to fellow staghunters. He also succeeded Col. Basset as Lt.Col. of the North Devon Militia (1793-4).
 August 1802- Hugh Fortescue, 1st Earl Fortescue (1753–1841)  of Castle Hill, Filleigh and Weare Hall, Weare Giffard.
 1824 pack sold to Germany.

Chichester's Hounds
 1827-1833 - Sir Arthur Chichester, 7th Baronet (1790–1842), of Youlston Park, Shirwell, formed his own pack composed of foxhounds
 1833/4-1836/7 - No hounds

Devon and Somerset Staghounds

 1837–1841 – Charles Palk Collyns (1793–1864) formed a new pack, named the "Devon and Somerset Subscription Staghounds". Collyns, a doctor living at Bilboa House, Dulverton, was the youngest son of William Collyns, a surgeon of Kenton, near Exeter, Devon. He was possibly related to the family of the Palk baronets of Haldon House, in the Haldon Hills, near Kenton. His hunting diaries and subscription lists are held by Somerset Archives. He wrote the standard work on West Country stag-hunting Chase of the Wild Red Deer, 1862. His inscribed grave stone, next to that of his son, survives against the external eastern wall of Dulverton Church, the only two stones in that position, clearly one of some honour.
 1842–1847 – Hon. Newton Fellowes (1772–Jan. 1854), of Eggesford, brother-in-law of Hugh Fortescue, 2nd Earl Fortescue. He was the second son of John Wallop, 2nd Earl of Portsmouth (d.1797) by his wife Urania Fellowes, heiress of Eggesford. Newton received from his mother the Eggesford estate, his elder brother having inherited in 1797 the earldom and his paternal lands in Hampshire. Newton demolished the old Eggesford House next to Eggesford Church and rebuilt it on the opposite side of the hill on the site of the former Heywood House. This house was in ruins in 1995, but was shortly thereafter restored.  He was a keen 4-in-hand carriage driver and improved many of the roads near Eggesford to facilitate his driving. He built the present bridge over the River Taw across which the A377 "scenic route" was built in about 1830 as a toll road. He married in 1820 as his second wife Lady Catherine Fortescue (1787-20/5/1854), a daughter of Hugh Fortescue, 1st Earl Fortescue (1753–1841) of Castle Hill, Filleigh. He became 4th Earl of Portsmouth in the last year of his life, following the death of his elder brother John Wallop, 3rd Earl of Portsmouth in 1853, the latter having had only one daughter and having been declared insane since 1809.
 1855–1881 – Mordaunt Fenwick-Bisset (1825–1884). "Restored the sport and put it on the footing from whence the present flourishing state of things has come", (Everard, 1902, p. 366). He reintroduced red deer to the Quantock Hills and built kennels at Bagborough House, a few miles northwest of Taunton. He lived at Pixton Park, Dulverton, which he rented from Lord Carnarvon, and kennelled the hounds at Jury, at the bottom of Pixton Drive. In January 1879, the pack was destroyed due to rabies. He sat as MP for West Somerset from 1880 until his resignation in 1883.
 1880/81–1887 – Hugh Fortescue, Viscount Ebrington (1854–1932), 4th Earl Fortescue from 1905. After 1879 he acquired the reversion of the whole of the former Royal Forest of Exmoor after the death of Frederick Winn Knight, which occurred in 1897.

 1887–1893 – Charles Henry Basset, Esq. (1834–1908), (born Williams) of Watermouth Castle, near Lynmouth, JP, DL and MP for Barnstaple (1868–1874). Born 16 November 1834, being the fourth surviving son of Sir William Williams, 1st Baronet (1791–1870), MFH, of Tregullow, Cornwall, by his wife Caroline Eales, younger daughter of Richard Eales of Eastdon, Lieutenant RN. Aged 13, he entered the Navy as a cadet on HMS Southampton. He served during the Crimean War in the Black Sea, and Sea of Azof, and was a Major in the Royal North Devon Yeomanry (or Hussars). In 1873, he lost his left arm in an accident whilst working a steam engine at Barnstaple. He married on 7 January 1878, Harriet Mary Basset (d. 1920), only daughter and sole heiress of Arthur Davie Basset, Esq., of Watermouth Castle (son of Joseph Davie Bassett (1764-1846)), and sister and co-heiress of Reverend Arthur Crawfurth Davie Basset, (1830–1880) JP and MA, also of Watermouth. As a condition of his inheritance, he assumed for himself his wife and their progeny by Royal Licence dated 11 October 1880 the surname of Basset in lieu of his patronymic, with the arms of Basset. Armorial bearings: Barry wavy of six or and gules in the centre chief point a cross crosslet of the last Crest: on a wreath of the colours, a unicorn's head couped argent, the mane, beard, and horn or, on the neck two bars indented gules, and charged for distinction with a cross crosslet also gules. Motto: Bene agere ac Laetari.  His estates were at Pilton House near Barnstaple; Westaway, his model farm in the parish of Pilton; Umberleigh House, Atherington; Watermouth Castle, Berrynarbor, all in North Devon.
 He introduced Spring staghunting.
 1893-1895 Colonel F. Hornby, who had previously been Field Master of the Queen's Staghounds. Entered office July 1893, resigned in Spring 1895 and went on in 1895 to be Master of the Essex Union Foxhounds.

 1895-1907 Robert Arthur Sanders (1867–1940) (Baron Bayford from 1929). Took on the mastership on Colonel F. Hornby's resignation in the spring of 1895, and increased the hunting days from three to four each week, being the first master to hunt the hounds himself, which he did one day per week, Viscount Ebrington then acting as Field Master. He married Miss Lucy Halliday, of Glenthorne, near Lynton, at Oare Church in July 1893. Mr. Sanders contested the Eastern division of Bristol at the General Election of 1900, and considerably lowered the previous Liberal majority. In 1901 he became an alderman of the Somerset County Council. He was the son of Arthur Sanders, of Fernhill, Isle of Wight, and was born in Paddington, London, and educated at Harrow, where he was head boy, and Balliol College, Oxford where he graduated with 1st class honours in Law. He became a barrister at the Inner Temple in 1891. Following his resignation of the mastership he became a Conservative Member of Parliament for Bridgwater, Somerset from 1910 until 1923. From 1911 to 1917 he was Lieutenant-Colonel of the Royal North Devon Yeomanry and served at Gallipoli, and in Egypt and Palestine. He was appointed a deputy lieutenant of Somerset in 1912. He was Treasurer of the Household (Government Deputy Chief Whip in the House of Commons), 1918–1919, and a junior Lord of the Treasury from 1919 until 1921. He then held ministerial office as Under-Secretary of State for War from 1921 to 1922 and Minister of Agriculture and Fisheries from 1922 to 1924. He was created a baronet in the 1920 New Year Honours and appointed to the Privy Council in 1922. He was MP for Wells in Somerset from 1924 to 1929, when he was raised to the peerage as Baron Bayford, of Stoke Trister in the County of Somerset. He married Lucy Sophia, daughter of William Halliday, in 1893. They had one son and two daughters. As his only son committed suicide in 1920, the title became extinct on Bayford's death in February 1940, aged 72. Lady Bayford died in September 1957.
 1907-c.1909 Edmund Arthur Vesey Stanley (1879–1941), from May 1907 following Mr Sanders' retirement. He was the son of Mr Edward James Stanley (d. 1907), of Quantock Lodge, Over StoweyMP for Bridgwater and a large landowner, by his wife Hon. Mary Dorothy Labouchere (1843–1920), a daughter of Henry Labouchere, 1st Baron Taunton (1798–1869), the prominent Liberal politician, MP for Taunton 1830-59 and Cabinet Minister. Labouchere purchased the manor of Over Stowey in 1833, and was created Baron Taunton in 1859. He built the Gothic revival castle known as Quantock Lodge, which later became Quantock School E.J. Stanley offered Mr Sanders to maintain a separate pack to hunt the Quantocks deer. The Committee and Master agreed and made over the country on permanent loan. His son, Edmund Stanley, then aged 22 performed the duty of huntsman. On his acceptance of the mastership of the D&S the Quantocks pack was discontinued. His sister became Mrs Heathcote-Amory, which family was associated with the Tiverton Staghounds, whilst his eldest brother, Lt. H. T. Stanley was killed in the Boer War.
 c. 1909 – c. 1911 – Captain Adkins 
 1911/12–1914 – Major Morland John Greig, of Edgcott House, Exford. Killed in action  at Gallipoli in October 1915 fighting with the 1st Royal North Devon Yeomanry. Dick Lloyd, President of the D&SSH, spoke in 2001 as follows about Morland Greig: "They never had a fixed house. They shuffled from one to another in an amazing way. They lived at Edgcott and Yealscombe, and Kings, Withypool... The Greigs were tremendously part of Exmoor in those days. Grandfather Greig, Morland Greig, was master of the Devon and Somerset when the first war started.  When the war started on the 3rd of August and on the 4th or 5th they took the hounds to the meet, he says in his diary that he went in mufti and the staff in uniform. They sang 'God save the King', and he sent the hounds home. He went straight off to his regiment, which was the Royal North Devon Yeomanry. In due course he went to Gallipoli and was killed. He was aged 53 (in fact 50). How many people of 43 or even 33, do you know who went to the last war? It was amazing fortitude. They wouldn't have let him go now. He was killed commanding the squadron in Gallipoli". His memorial tablet exists in St. Mary Magdalene Church, Exford. He was the son of John Peter Morland Greig and Annie Lydia Greig and married Kate Greig, of Edgcott, Exford, Somerset. He is buried at I.I.16. HILL 10 CEMETERY. A bust-length watercolour portrait of him 11 1/8" * 10 1/8" was painted by Olivia Mary Bryden (1883–1951) of Eastbourne and sold at auction by Bonhams Knightsbridge, 27 July 2005, Sporting Pictures, sale no. 11639, lot 69.
 1915-c.1917 - Committee
 c.1917-1919/20 - William Badco (1864–1921) of Cardiff, tramp-ship owner. He was a stranger to Exmoor, and was on holiday in Minehead when he heard of the problems which were starting to arise due to the absence of deer control due to the death of the last master. At this time of war sporting considerations were secondary. He offered to undertake the mastership at his own expense without any funding guaranteed, and continued until the 1919-20 season, when he retired to Badminton. MacDermot wrote of him: "Staghunters and the country in general owe a very deep debt of gratitude to his memory for keeping the hunt going, largely at his own expense, through a most difficult time". He was a shipowner and changed his name from "Badcock" to "Badco" by deed-poll dated 11 March 1916, who lived "formerly" at St Ives, Cornwall, but who was living in 1916 at Cathedral Street, Cardiff. He was from St Ives and started his career as a clerk with a Mr Haines. In 1900, he floated the Polurrian Steamship Co. Ltd., to raise funds for the purchase of the steamer of that name then being built at Blumen's yard in Sunderland. He similarly floated the Poldhu Steamship Co. Ltd., the following year to acquire the Poldhu from the same yard. He moved from St Ives in 1909 to Cardiff and took delivery of his third new vessel, the Polvarth. The Pol- prefix of his ships was a Cornish reference. Between 1910 -13 he bought three second-hand ships, the Polmanter, Polcarne and Polperro, to meet the improving market. However, before the end of World War I he had sold five of his ships, having lost one to a U-boat attack. The average tonnage of his vessels was about 3,000 tons.

 c. 1917-23 April 1936 – Lieutenant-Colonel Walter William Wiggin (1856–1936). He was a son of Sir Henry Samuel Wiggin, 1st Baronet (1824–1905) by his wife Mary Elizabeth Malins. His brother was Brigadier-General E. A. Wiggin and his nephew was Col. W. H. Wiggin. He was Colonel of the Queen's Own Worcestershire Yeomanry and lived at Forhill House, King's Norton, Birmingham. He married Edith Atkins, daughter of George Caleb Atkins. He died aged 81 on 4 November 1936 at King's Norton, and was buried at Alvechurch on 9 November 1936. His obituary in the Colliery Guardian and Journal of the Coal and Iron Trades, 13 November 1936, was as follows: "The death has occurred at the age of 80 (sic) of Lieut.-Col. Walter W. Wiggin, who entered his father's business, Henry Wiggin and Co., of Birmingham, at the age of 22, ultimately becoming a director and finally chairman in 1916. He retired in 1920 when the business was merged with the Mond Nickel Co. He had served also as a director of Joseph Lucas and at his death was on the boards of W. and T. Avery, the South Staffordshire Waterworks Co. and Henry Pooley and Son". He lived at Stockleigh when hunting on Exmoor.
 1935/6-end of World War II – Hancock of Rhyll Manor, East Anstey, a descendant of the prominent Hancock brewing family of Wiveliscombe in Somerset. They were also masters of the Dulverton Foxhounds, and kenneled the foxhounds at Rhyll; Abbott
 1981–present – Maurice Scott (joint-master)
 1987–present – Diana Scott (joint-master)
 2000/1–present – George Witheridge (joint-master)
 -present – Fran Bell (joint-master)

List of huntsmen

Ernest Bawden (1878-1943), huntsman from 1917-1937. A huntsman of legendary status. His biography was written by Paddy King-Fretts (2005). He was of an ancient tenant-farmer family of Hawkridge in Somerset. Several paintings of him in action were made by Lionel Edwards (1878-1966). His grave in Hawkridge churchyard is covered by a massive granite stone inscribed: "Ernest Comer Bawden, March 3, 1878 – September 10, 1943; Huntsman D&SSH 1917-1937". "At his feet" (immediately west of his grave) lies buried one of his greatest admirers, Col. Eustace Harrison (1876-1962) of Combe, Dulverton, lord of the manor of Hawkridge.

Kennels
late 1700s: Highercombe, Dulverton (Sir Thomas Acland) 
1812-1818 Castle Hill, Filleigh (Earl Fortescue)
up to 1861 Jury, Dulverton
1861-1876 Rhyll, East Anstey.
1876–present Exford. Built by Mr Bisset and donated to the Committee.

Sources
Huskisson, Mike, The Persecution of Red Deer on and around Exmoor and the Quantocks; A Review of the Literature
Macdermot, E.T. The Devon and Somerset Staghounds, 1936
Bailey's Hunting Directory
Aldin, Cecil. Exmoor: The Riding Playground of England, 1935
Collyns, Charles Palk. Chase of the Wild Red Deer, 1862
Scarth-Dixon, William, "Devon and Somerset Staghounds" (booklet)
Vowles, Alfred. Stag-hunting on Exmoor, 1920
Bourne, Hope. A Little History of Exmoor, 1968
Evered, Philip. Staghunting with the Devon and Somerset: An Account of the Chase of the Wild Red Deer, 1902. Everard was elected treasurer, secretary and administrator of the deer damage fund on the resignation of Mr. A. C. E. Locke in 1894.

Further reading
Fawcett, William, The Devon and Somerset Staghounds, Hunts Association, 1933
Fortescue, Hon. John, Records of Stag-Hunting on Exmoor, London, 1887 (based on the 13 journals of Col. Bisset, master 1855-1881)

External links
Devon and Somerset Staghounds official website

References

Hunting and shooting in the United Kingdom
Sport in Somerset
Stag hunts in the United Kingdom